Rahmatabad (also Romanized as Raḩmatābād; also known as Sīāh Qar) is a village in Rivand Rural District, in the Central District of Nishapur County, Razavi Khorasan Province, Iran. At the 2006 census, its population was 1,194, in 339 families.

References 

Populated places in Nishapur County